Moreshwar Ramchandra Paradkar (Devanagari: मोरेश्वर रामजी पराडकर) (1729–1794), popularly known in Maharashtra  as Moropant (मोरोपंत) or Mayur Pandit (मयूर पंडित), was a Marathi poet who was the last among those classified by Marathi literary scholars as pandit (पंडित) poets. He was born in a Karhade Brahmin family at Panhala. (Mukteshwar, Vaman Pandit, Raghunath Pandit, and Shridhar Pandit were other prominent pandit poets.)

Moropant had planned to write 108 Ramayan-s, but the actual number written by him comes to 94-95. Some of the versions probably cover only a stanza or two or five. He wrote Niroshhth Ramayan, which eschews all consonants of pa-varga. Since labial or oshhthya consonants are absent, it is called Nirishhtha Ramayan. Some versions were dedicated to a single poetic metre, like Vibudhapriya-Ramayan and Panch-chaamara Ramayan..his great grand son Kapil ramkrushna paradkar stays at Pune at vitthalwadi sinhagad road .he retired from international book depot recently after 55 years of service

Works
He is most famous for his mastery over Arya (आर्या) and Pruthvi (पृथ्वी)  chhanda-s.
Kekavali was his last major work, which he finished in early 1790s.

The following are some of the works of Moropant:

 Aryabaharat (आर्याभारत) (17,170 Arya couplets, plus two : one quatrain in Shardulvikridit, one in Arya-geeti)
 Marathi Ramayan (रामायण) (16,000 couplets)
 Arya-Kekavali (आर्याकेकावली, in Arya metre; this one should not be confused with his more famous Kekavali)
 Mantrabhagawat (मंत्रभागवत) (3,592 couplets)
 Krushnavijay (कृष्णविजय) (3,669 couplets)
 Harivamsha (हरिवंश) (5,444 couplets)
 Brahmottarakhand (ब्रह्मोत्तरखंड) (1,200 couplets)
 Kekavali (केकावली, 121 quatrains in पृथ्वी, and the last one in Sragdhara; his last major work)
 Samshaya-Ratnamala (संशय-रत्नमाला)
 Satigeet'' (सतीगीत)

References 
 

Marathi-language writers
1729 births
1794 deaths